The Botali P.A.M.A or Botali-du Rivau P.A.M.A. Type 1 was a very low power French single seat aircraft built in 1934 to a target price of 20,000 Francs.

Design and development
In order to meet a target price of 20,000 Francs set by the Air Ministry a decade before, Botali designed a 1930s version of the very low power light aircraft that competed in the Lympne light aircraft trials of the 1920s. Unlike the earlier aircraft, his design had an enclosed cabin and robust landing gear. His P.A.M.A. designation stood for planeur à moteur auxiliary, or motor glider.

Built in collaboration with du Rivau, the Botali P.A.M.A was a high wing, braced monoplane. In plan its two-piece wing was rectangular apart from rounded tips. The wings were wire braced on each side, with a pair of stout flying wires from the lower fuselage to the spars and thinner landing wires from a triangular steel tube cabane on the upper fuselage. Long ailerons, with a chord of only  occupied the entire trailing edge.

The fabric covered fuselage of the Botali was flat-sided, with four spruce longerons connected by spruce diagonal members. At the front two vertical frames defined the cabin and carried the engine bearings, braced by a rhomboidal frame to the wing leading edge. Its horizontal cylinder-shaped nose had the  air-cooled Poinsard flat twin attached to it externally. Access was via a starboard side door. Behind the cabin the fuselage tapered, markedly in plan, to the tail. This was conventional, with a triangular fin and rectangular rudder that reached to the keel. The tailplane and separate elevators were also rectangular in plan apart from a deep cut-out in the latter for rudder movement.

The Botali's landing gear was simple: on each side a wheel was mounted on the apex of three steel tubes, two from the lower longeron and a third to the nose framework about halfway up the fuselage.

It was flown for the first time on 22 May 1934 by Pierre Pharabod at Toussus-Paris, who reported good handling. In December 1934 the P.A.M.A. Type 1 was successfully demonstrated at Orly by Cressaty, flying along with several other French light aircraft in very wet and windy weather; a Mignet Pou-de-Ciel took the honours. It was displayed at the 14th Paris Aero-Salon in the same month.

Specifications

References

1930s French sport aircraft
High-wing aircraft
Single-engined tractor aircraft
Aircraft first flown in 1934
Motor gliders